The giant grey shrike (Lanius giganteus) is a species of bird in the family Laniidae. It is found in China. Its natural habitat is temperate forests. It was formerly considered a subspecies of the Chinese grey shrike (Lanius sphenocercus), but was split as a distinct species by the IOC in 2021.

References

giant grey shrike
Birds of Central China
Endemic birds of China
giant grey shrike
giant grey shrike